Dashi Station  is a station of Line 3 of the Guangzhou Metro that started operation on 28December 2006. It is located under the New Moon Pearl Garden in the Dashi Subdistrict (zh), Panyu District, which is near where the Xinguang Expressway passes over Qunxian Road. The station has reservations to interchange with Line 7. The northern end of the concourse has structures reserved for the two side platforms for Line 7. However, Line 7 was adjusted and changed to Hanxi Changlong station and the reserved structure of this station has been left unused and covered with enamel panels.

Station layout

Exits

References

Railway stations in China opened in 2006
Guangzhou Metro stations in Panyu District